António Jorge (born 7 November 1926) is a Portuguese former sports shooter. He competed in the 50 metre pistol event at the 1960 Summer Olympics.

References

External links

1926 births
Possibly living people
Portuguese male sport shooters
Olympic shooters of Portugal
Shooters at the 1960 Summer Olympics